= Samuel Heckscher =

German-Jewish scholar

Samuel ben Meïr Heckscher was a German-Jewish scholar, who lived at Altona in the seventeenth and eighteenth centuries. He was the author of a work entitled Ḳinah 'al Serefah, in Hebrew and German, on the great fire which raged at Altona in 1711.
